Christiansdorf, historically spelt Christianesdorph in 1183 and Christianisdorf in 1185, was a forest settlement in the Duchy of Saxony (the present day German state of Saxony) that only existed for a few years, but is credited as being the first place in the Ore Mountains that silver ore was discovered. The little mining settlement in the March of Meissen and was a forerunner of the present town of Freiberg, which itself was founded in the 1160s. Christiansdorf was located on the so-called Schüppchenberg hill, where the cul-de-sac of Berggasse now is. 

According to oral tradition and legend, the first ore - sterling silver - in the Freiberg Mining Field, and also in the whole Ore Mountains, was discovered on the fields of Christiansdorf by the Schüppchenberg  around 1168.

References

External links 
 Christiansdorf

Mittelsachsen
Freiberg
Former municipalities in Saxony